Rega im Dodley (lit. Rega with Dodley or A Moment with Dodley) was an Israeli children’s television show. Produced by Israeli Educational Television, the program aired from 1976 to 1981, after which it then aired in reruns.

Format
The show featured  Dodley, a grocery store owner, his companion Rega, a marionette that became a child, and Fistuk, as well as guest stars and an ensemble of children. Most episodes would take place in Dodley’s store, which was also home to the robot-like contraption Havitush. However, some episodes also took place outside of the shop and in the Ramat Aviv neighbourhood where the series was filmed.

The show aimed to educate children on topics such as friendship and helping others, as well as expanding their knowledge in diverse topics such as communication, and the differences between adults and children.

Each program opened with a short animated segment featuring a bird called Tzipi. These shorts were animated by Tuvia Kurtz, who also designed the butterfly puppets for Parpar Nechmad.

Production
With color television in Israel only being gradually introduced during the series’ run, Rega im Dodley was predominantly filmed in black and white at the Israeli Educational Television studios in Tel Aviv. However, one episode, in which the characters visit a port, was filmed in color outside of the studio using a recently purchased mobile broadcasting facility that fully permitted for color broadcasts and filming.

Six of the episodes, including the first episode, had been considered lost, as IETV did not convert the original 16mm film into a modern format. However, as of 2008, all episodes had been successfully recovered, restored and archived on modern broadcast tapes.

Characters

 Rega (רגע, Moment) is a boy marionette who came to life, becoming a child. He is played by female actress Tzipi Mor.
 Dodley (דודלי, meaning 'uncle of mine') is the neighborhood grocery store owner, who lives alone near his store. He is played by Shlomo Nitzan.
 Fistuk (פיסטוק, Pistachio) is friends with Dodley and Rega. He is kind, but also quite clumsy. Played by Sefi Rivlin. 
 Havitush (חביתוש, Pancake) - A barrel-bodied robot made of household items that lives in Dodley’s store; he can talk and move like a human provided that the spring in his mechanism is stretched with a key. He is also voiced by Nitzan.

See also
 List of programs broadcast by the Israeli Educational Television

External links
 Rega im Dodley on Kan Educational. 
 

Israeli children's television series
Black-and-white television shows
Israeli Educational Television
1976 Israeli television series debuts
1970s Israeli television series
1980s Israeli television series
1981 Israeli television series endings
Israeli television shows featuring puppetry